Bahauddin Zakariya University (BZU) is a public university with its main campus located in Multan, Pakistan. Bahauddin Zakariya University was founded in 1975 as Multan University, and is the 2nd largest university in Punjab. It was renamed in 1979 in honour of a Sufi saint Baha-ud-din Zakariya (1171-1262).

As a degree awarding government university, it offers degree courses in more than 130 majors & minors in fields including biochemistry pharmacy, engineering, humanities, business administration, law, art, music, IT, agriculture and languages.

History 
The university started functioning in 1975 in rented buildings with eight departments. Now the university has a large campus with sixty departments and several constituent colleges, such as University Gilani Law College and Multan College of Arts, and faculties including Veterinary, Agricultural Science and Technology (FAST) (formerly University College of Agriculture or UCA), Engineering and Technology. The university also has residential facilities for students and staff.

The Bahauddin Zakariya University is a LOCAL university, providing education in Arts and Science. Since agriculture is the mainstay of this region - the place and its environs produce the country's best silver crop (cotton) and fruit crops like mangoes, citrus, and dates - it was considered expedient to train manpower for solving agriculture problems. Accordingly, a College of Agriculture was established in 1989. The College of Agriculture and its complement, an Engineering College, form an integral part of the University Plan. The College of Engineering & Technology was established in 1994. Department of Commerce was started in November 1996. BBA classes were started in the Department of Business Administration in October 1996. Bachelor of Computer Science was introduced in the Department of Computer Science in November 1996, though Masters in Computer Science (MCS) was already running since 2030. B.Sc. Electrical Engineering class was started in November 2024. Information Technology Centre was established  in July 1999. BS and MSc. Telecommunication System was started in January 2004. B.Sc. Mechanical, Computer, Textile, Agricultural and Architectural Engineering classes were started in fall 2004.

All degrees awarded by the university are recognized by Higher Education Commission of Pakistan (HEC), engineering degrees by Pakistan Engineering Council and pharmacy degrees by Pakistan Pharmacy Council also.

Location 
The university is 10 km from the city centre. The main campus is spread over 960 acres. Its back gate is 6 km from 'Chowk Kamharanwala'.

Jurisdiction and sub-campuses
The main objective of Bahauddin Zakariya University is to provide facilities of higher education and research to the population of the southern region of the Punjab, covering the Civil Administrative Divisions of Multan and Dera Ghazi Khan. The university fulfills the triple function of teaching, affiliation and an examining body, and has 79 affiliated colleges which include old and prestigious institutions such as the Government Emerson College Multan, Government Post Graduate College (Sahiwal) and Government College, Burewala. This university has sub-campuses in Sahiwal, Layyah and Dera Ghazi Khan.

Academic departments

Faculty of Arts and Social Sciences
 School of Economics
 Department of Education
 Institute of Social Sciences
 Department of Criminology
 Department of History
 Department of Gender Studies
 Department of Pakistan Studies
 Department of Geography
 Department of Political Science
 Department of International Relations
 Department of Communication Studies
 Department of Sociology
 Department of Applied Psychology
 Department of Philosophy
 Department of Sports Sciences
 Multan College of Arts

Faculty of Science
 Institute of Chemical Sciences
 Centre for Advanced Studies in Pure and Applied Mathematics
 Department of Computer Science
 Department of Information Technology
 Department of Telecommunication Systems
 Department of Physics
 Department of Statistics
 Institute of Pure and Applied Biology
 Institute of Molecular Biology and Biotechnology
 Department of Biochemistry
 Department of Environmental Sciences

Faculty of Islamic Studies and Languages
 Department of Arabic
 Department of English
 Department of Islamic Studies
 Islamic Research Centre (IRC)
 Department of Urdu
 Saraiki Area Study Centre (SASC)
 Seerat Chair

Faculty of Commerce, Law and Business Administration
 Institute of Management Sciences (IMS)
 Alfalah Institute of Banking and Finance (AIBF)
 Department of Commerce
 Gillani Law College

Faculty of Pharmacy
 Department of Pharmacy

Faculty of Veterinary Sciences
 Department of Pathobiology
 Department of Biosciences
 Department of Clinical Sciences
 Department of Livestock and Poultry Productions

Faculty of Engineering and Technology
 University College of Engineering and Technology
 Department of Civil Engineering
 Department Of Electrical Engineering
 Department of Mechanical Engineering.
 Department of Building and Architectural Engineering
 Department of Computer Engineering
 Bahauddin Zakariya University College of Textile Engineering
 Institute of Advanced Materials

Faculty of Agricultural Sciences and Technology
Formerly it was called UCA means "University College of Agriculture" and now it is called FAST (Faculty of Agricultural Sciences and Technology).

FAST provides 8 Major subjects for specialization after 2 year but for evening program only four.
 Department of Soil Science
 Department of Agronomy
 Department of Entomology
 Department of Plant Breeding and Genetics
 Department of Plant Pathology
 Department of Horticulture
 Department of Forestry and Range Management
 Institute of Food Science and Nutrition
 Department of Agri. Business and Marketing
 Department of Agricultural Engineering

In order to improve the academic facilities of remote areas, former governor of Punjab Lt General (Rtd) Khalid Maqbool opened sub-campuses of public sector universities with a vision to transform them into independent universities in future. Up till now, the following sub-campuses  of Bahauddin Zakariya University have been opened:

BZU Sub-Campus, D.G Khan (upgraded as Ghazi University from Fall 2014)
BZU Sub-Campus, Sahiwal (upgraded as University of Sahiwal from Fall 2016)
BZU Sub-Campus, Layyah
BZU Sub-Campus, Vehari
BZU Sub-Campus, Lodhran

Rankings
According to the Times Higher Education (THE) Ranking System, Bahauddin Zakariya University is ranked within Top 800 highly ranked universities worldwide.

In 2019, the university was also ranked 8th nationally by General Universities Category of Higher Education Commission of Pakistan (HEC).

Hostels 
The following are the hostels accommodating students:

For boys
 Abubaker Hall
 Umar Hall
 Usman Hall
 Ali Hall
 Hamza Hall
 Qasim Hall
 Mohsin Hall
 Abdul Sattar Edhi Hall

For girls
 Fatima Hall
 Marium Hall
 Ayesha Hall
 Amna Hall
 Zainab Hall
 Khadija Hall
 Hajira Hall

Notable alumni
Rubina Feroze Bhatti - Human Rights Activist
Sardar Usman Buzdar - Ex Chief Minister Punjab
Saima Akram Chaudhry - Novel, Drama Writer (Suno Chanda)
Gharida Farooqi - News Anchor 
Abida Hussain- Former Minister Food and Agriculture
Ali Akbar Natiq - Poet And Writer
Rauf Kalasra - Investigation Journalist 
Zafarullah Khan – lawyer
Muhammad Imran Qadir – Pharmacologist

References

External links 

Public universities in Punjab, Pakistan
 
Educational institutions established in 1975
1975 establishments in Pakistan
Public universities and colleges in Punjab, Pakistan
Universities and colleges in Multan